The X Bar X Boys was a series of western adventures for boys created by the Stratemeyer Syndicate and written under the pseudonym of James Cody Ferris and published by Grosset & Dunlap. At first, a total of 2 or 3 volumes were published per year, but in 1930, it slowed to 1 book per year. In 1942, the series was discontinued.

Leslie McFarlane, author of many Hardy Boys stories, contributed to this series as well.

The Manley Boys, Roy and Teddy, are the sons of an old ranchman, the owner of many thousands of head of cattle. The lads know how to ride, how to shoot, and how to take care of themselves under any and all circumstances.

The cowboys of the X Bar X ranch are real cowboys, on the job when required but full of fun and daring—a bunch any reader will be delighted to know.

List Of Titles

External links

 The X Bar X Boys Site
 The X Bar X Boys Page

Book series introduced in 1926
Stratemeyer Syndicate
American children's novels
Juvenile series
American novel series
Western (genre) novels
Works published under a pseudonym
Grosset & Dunlap books
1920s children's books
1930s children's books